The National Network is an English language Nigerian weekly newspaper founded 25 November 2004. It is published by  Network Printing and Publishing Company and has its headquarters in the Diobu area of Port Harcourt, Rivers State. Topics the newspaper covers include local and national main news, sports, business, political events  and personalities.

In January 2005, Jerry Needam, owner of the paper was arrested at his office for allegedly fabricating a news report aimed at tarnishing Rivers State Police commissioner Sylvester Araba's image and reputation.

In 2011, National Network celebrated the "seventh" anniversary of its foundation. The ceremony which took place at the Silverbird Hall, Port Harcourt, was the most attended of its kind in the state's history. Individual awards were also presented to prominent citizens deemed to have excelled to the highest degree in their chosen fields.

See also

 List of Nigerian newspapers

References

External links
 Official web site

Publications established in 2004
Newspapers published in Port Harcourt
2004 establishments in Nigeria
2000s establishments in Rivers State
English-language newspapers published in Africa
Companies based in Port Harcourt
Diobu, Port Harcourt
Weekly newspapers published in Nigeria